Radio Free Europe/Radio Liberty (RFE/RL) is a United States government funded organization that broadcasts and reports news, information, and analysis to countries in Eastern Europe, Central Asia, Caucasus, and the Middle East where it says that "the free flow of information is either banned by government authorities or not fully developed". RFE/RL is a private, non-profit 501(c)(3) corporation supervised by the U.S. Agency for Global Media, an independent government agency overseeing all U.S. federal government international broadcasting services. Jeremy Bransten is acting editor-in-chief of RFE.

RFE/RL broadcasts in 27 languages to 23 countries. The organization has been headquartered in Prague, Czech Republic, since 1995, and has 21 local bureaus with over 500 core staff and 1,300 stringers and freelancers in countries throughout their broadcast region. In addition, it has 680 employees at its headquarters and corporate office in Washington, D.C.

During the Cold War, RFE was broadcast to Soviet satellite states, including the Baltic states, and RL targeted the Soviet Union; RFE was founded as an anti-communist propaganda source in 1949 by the National Committee for a Free Europe, while RL was founded two years later. The two organizations merged in 1976. Communist governments frequently sent agents to infiltrate RFE's headquarters, and the KGB regularly jammed its signals. RFE/RL was headquartered at Englischer Garten in Munich, West Germany, from 1949 to 1995. Another broadcast site was operated at the village of Glória do Ribatejo, east of Lisbon, Portugal, from 1951 to 1996. European operations have been significantly reduced since the end of the Cold War.

Early history

Radio Free Europe 

Radio Free Europe was created and grew in its early years through the efforts of the National Committee for a Free Europe (NCFE), an anti-communist CIA front organization that was formed by Allen Dulles in New York City in 1949. RFE/RL received funds covertly from the CIA until 1972. During RFE's earliest years of existence, the CIA and U.S. Department of State issued broad policy directives, and a system evolved where broadcast policy was determined through negotiation between them and RFE staff.

Radio Free Europe received widespread public support from Eisenhower's "Crusade for Freedom" campaign. In 1950, over 16 million Americans signed Eisenhower's "Freedom Scrolls" on a publicity trip to more than 20 U.S. cities and contributed $1,317,000 to the expansion of RFE.

Writer Sig Mickelson said that the NCFE's mission was to support refugees and provide them with a useful outlet for their opinions and creativity while increasing exposure to the modern world. The NCFE divided its program into three parts: exile relations, radio, and American contacts.

The United States funded a long list of projects to counter the "Communist appeal" among intellectuals in Europe and the developing world. RFE was developed out of a belief that the Cold War would eventually be fought by political rather than military means. American policymakers such as George Kennan and John Foster Dulles acknowledged that the Cold War was essentially a war of ideas. The implementation of surrogate radio stations was a key part of the greater psychological war effort.

RFE was modeled after Radio in the American Sector (RIAS) a U.S. government-sponsored radio service initially intended for Germans living in the American sector of Berlin. According to writer Arch Puddington, it was also widely listened to by East Germans. Staffed almost entirely by Germans with minimal U.S. supervision, the station provided free media to German listeners.

In January 1950, the NCFE obtained a transmitter base at Lampertheim, West Germany, and on July 4 of the same year RFE completed its first broadcast aimed at Czechoslovakia. In late 1950, RFE began to assemble a full-fledged foreign broadcast staff, becoming more than a "mouthpiece for exiles". Teams of journalists were hired for each language service, and an elaborate system of intelligence gathering provided up-to-date broadcast material. Most of this material came from a network of well-connected émigrés and interviews with travelers and defectors. RFE did not use paid agents inside the Iron Curtain and based its bureaus in regions popular with exiles. RFE also extensively monitored Communist bloc publications and radio services, creating an impressive body of information that would later serve as a resource for organizations across the world.

In addition to its regular broadcasts, RFE spread broadcasts through a series of operations that distributed leaflets via meteorological balloons; one such operation, Prospero, sent messages to Czechoslovakia. From October 1951 to November 1956, the skies of Central Europe were filled with more than 350,000 balloons carrying over 300 million leaflets, posters, books, and other printed matter. The nature of the leaflets varied, and according to Arch Puddington included messages of support and encouragement "to citizens suffering under communist oppression", "satirical criticisms of communist regimes and leaders", information about dissident movements and human rights campaigns, and messages expressing the solidarity of the American people with the residents of Eastern European nations. Puddington stated that "the project served as a publicity tool to solidify RFE's reputation as an unbiased broadcaster".

Radio Liberty 

Whereas Radio Free Europe broadcast to Soviet satellite countries, Radio Liberty broadcast to the Soviet Union. Radio Liberty was formed by American Committee for the Liberation of the Peoples of Russia (Amcomlib) in 1951. Originally named Radio Liberation, the station was renamed in 1959 after a policy statement emphasizing "liberalization" rather than "liberation".

Radio Liberty began broadcasting from Lampertheim on March 1, 1953, gaining a substantial audience when it covered the death of Joseph Stalin four days later. In order to better serve a greater geographic area, RFE supplemented its shortwave transmissions from Lampertheim with broadcasts from a transmitter base at Glória, Portugal in 1951. It also had a base at Oberwiesenfeld Airport on the outskirts of Munich, employing several former Nazi agents who had been involved in the Ostministerium under Gerhard von Mende during World War II. In 1955, Radio Liberty began broadcasting programs to Russia's eastern provinces from shortwave transmitters located on Taiwan. In 1959, Radio Liberty commenced broadcasts from a base at Platja de Pals, Spain.

Radio Liberty expanded its audience by broadcasting programs in languages other than Russian. By March 1954, Radio Liberty was broadcasting six to seven hours daily in eleven languages. By December 1954, Radio Liberty was broadcasting in 17 languages including Ukrainian, Belarusian, Kazakh, Kyrgyz, Tajik, Turkmen, Uzbek, Tatar, Bashkir, Armenian, Azerbaijani, Georgian, and other languages of the Caucasus and Central Asia.

List of languages

Cold War years

Radio Free Europe
According to certain European politicians such as Petr Nečas, RFE played a significant role in the collapse of communism and the development of democracy in Eastern Europe. Unlike government-censored programs, RFE publicized anti-Soviet protests and nationalist movements. Its audience increased substantially following the failed Berlin riots of 1953 and the highly publicized defection of Józef Światło. Arch Puddington argues that its Hungarian service's coverage of Poland's Poznań riots in 1956 served as an inspiration for the Hungarian revolution that year.

Hungary
During the Hungarian Revolution of 1956, RFE broadcasts encouraged rebels to fight and suggested that Western support was imminent. These RFE broadcasts violated Eisenhower's policy, which had determined that the United States would not provide military support for the Revolution. In the wake of this scandal, a number of changes were implemented at RFE, including the establishment of the Broadcast Analysis Division to ensure that broadcasts were accurate and professional while maintaining the journalists' autonomy.

Romania
RFE was seen as a serious threat by Romanian president Nicolae Ceaușescu. From the mid-1970s to his overthrow and execution in December 1989, Ceaușescu waged a vengeful war against the RFE/RL under the program "Ether". Ether operations included physical attacks on Romanian journalists working for RFE/RL, including the controversial circumstances surrounding the deaths of three directors of RFE/RL's Romanian Service.

1981 RFE/RL Munich bombing
On February 21, 1981, RFE/RL's headquarters in Munich was struck by a massive bomb, causing $2 million in damage. Several employees were injured, but there were no fatalities. Stasi files opened after 1989 indicated that the bombing was carried out by a group under the direction of Ilich Ramírez Sánchez (known as "Carlos the Jackal"), and paid for by Nicolae Ceaușescu, president of Romania. 

But, according to the former head of the KGB Counterintelligence Department K, general Oleg Kalugin, the bombing operation was planned over two years by Department K, with the active involvement of a KGB mole inside the radio station, Oleg Tumanov. This revelation directly implicates KGB colonel Oleg Nechiporenko, who recruited Tumanov in the early 1960s and was his Moscow curator. Nechiporenko has never denied his involvement. In an interview with Radio Liberty in 2003, he justified the bombing on the grounds that RFE/RL was an American propaganda tool against the Soviet Union. Tumanov was exfiltrated back to the USSR in 1986. Nechiporenko contacts with Carlos in the 1970s were confirmed by Nechiporenko himself in an article published by Segodnya in 2000 and by an article in Izvestia in 2001.

Chernobyl disaster
For the first two days following the Chernobyl disaster on April 26, 1986, the official Eastern Bloc media did not report any news about the disaster, nor any full account for another four months. According to the Hoover Institute, the people of the Soviet Union "became frustrated with inconsistent and contradictory reports", and 36% of them turned to Western radio to provide accurate and pertinent information. Listenership at RFE/RL "shot up dramatically" as a "great many hours" of broadcast time were devoted to the dissemination of life-saving news and information following the disaster. Broadcast topics included "precautions for exposure to radioactive fallout" and reporting on the plight of the Estonians who were tasked with providing the clean-up operations in Ukraine.

Poland and Czechoslovakia
Communist governments also sent agents to infiltrate RFE's headquarters. Although some remained on staff for extended periods of time, government authorities discouraged their agents from interfering with broadcast activity, fearing that this could arouse suspicions and detract from their original purpose of gathering information on the radio station's activities. From 1965 to 1971, an agent of the SB (Służba Bezpieczeństwa, Communist Poland's security service) successfully infiltrated the station with an operative, Captain Andrzej Czechowicz. According to former Voice of America Polish service director Ted Lipien: 
"Czechowicz is perhaps the most well known communist-era Polish spy who was still an active agent while working at RFE in the late 1960s. Technically, he was not a journalist. As a historian by training, he worked in the RFE's media analysis service in Munich. After more than five years, Czechowicz returned to Poland in 1971 and participated in programs aimed at embarrassing Radio Free Europe and the United States government."

According to Richard Cummings, former Security Chief of Radio Free Europe, other espionage incidents included a failed attempt by a Czechoslovak Intelligence Service (StB) agent in 1959 to poison the salt shakers in the organization's cafeteria.

In late 1960, an upheaval in the Czechoslovak service led to a number of dramatic changes in the organization's structure. RFE's New York headquarters could no longer effectively manage their Munich subsidiary. As a result major management responsibilities were transferred to Munich, making RFE a European-based organization.

According to Puddington, Polish Solidarity leader Lech Wałęsa and Russian reformer Grigory Yavlinsky would later recall secretly listening to the broadcasts despite the heavy jamming.

Jamming
The Soviet government turned its efforts towards blocking reception of Western programs. To limit access to foreign broadcasts, the Central Committee decreed that factories should remove all components allowing short-wave reception from USSR-made radio receivers. However, consumers easily learned that the necessary spare parts were available on the black market, and electronics engineers opposing the idea would gladly convert radios back to being able to receive short-wave transmissions.

The most extensive form of reception obstruction was radio jamming. This was controlled by the KGB, which in turn reported to the Central Committee. Jamming was an expensive and arduous procedure, and its efficacy is still debated. In 1958, the Central Committee mentioned that the sum spent on jamming was greater than the sum spent on domestic and international broadcasting combined. The Central Committee has admitted that circumventing jamming was both possible and practised in the Soviet Union. Due to limited resources, authorities prioritized jamming based on the location, language, time, and theme of Western transmissions. Highly political programs in Russian, broadcast at prime time to urban centers, were perceived as the most dangerous. Seen as less politically threatening, Western music such as jazz was often transmitted unjammed. The intensity of jamming fluctuated over time. 

During and after the Cuban Missile Crisis in late 1962, jamming was intensified. The Cuban Missile Crisis, however, was followed by a five-year period when the jamming of most foreign broadcasters ceased, only to intensify again with the Prague Spring in 1968. It ceased again in 1973, when Henry Kissinger became the U.S. Secretary of State. The end to jamming came abruptly on 21 November 1988 when Soviet and Eastern European jamming of virtually all foreign broadcasts, including RFE/RL services, ceased at 21:00 CET.

United States
During the Cold War RFE was often criticized in the United States as not being sufficiently anti-communist. Although its non-governmental status spared it from full scale McCarthyist investigations, several RFE journalists, including the director of the Czech service, Ferdinand Peroutka, were accused of being soft on Communism. Fulton Lewis, a U.S. radio commentator and fervent anti-communist, was one of RFE's sharpest critics throughout the 1950s. His critical broadcasts inspired other journalists to investigate the inner workings of the organization, including its connection to the CIA. When its CIA ties were exposed in the 1960s, direct funding responsibility shifted to Congress.

Funding

RFE/RL received funds from the CIA until 1972. The CIA's relationship with the radio stations began to break down in 1967, when Ramparts magazine published an exposé claiming that the CIA was channeling funds to civilian organizations. Further investigation into the CIA's funding activities revealed its connection to both RFE and RL, sparking significant media outrage.

In 1971, the radio stations came under public spotlight once more when U.S. Senator Clifford Case introduced Senate Bill 18, which would have removed funding for RFE and RL from the CIA's budget, appropriated $30 million to pay for fiscal year 1972 activities, and required the State Department to temporarily oversee the radio stations. This was only a temporary solution, however, as the State Department was reluctant to take on such a significant long-term responsibility.

In May 1972, President Richard Nixon appointed a special commission to deliberate RFE/RL's future. The commission proposed that funding come directly from the United States Congress and that a new organization, the Board for International Broadcasting (BIB) would simultaneously link the stations and the federal government, and serve as an editorial buffer between them.

Although both radio stations initially received most of their funding from the CIA, RFE maintained a strong sense of autonomy. Under Cord Meyer, the CIA officer in charge of overseeing broadcast services from 1954 to 1971, the CIA took a position of minimal government interference in radio affairs and programming.

The CIA stopped funding Radio Free Europe and Radio Liberty in 1972. In 1974, they came under the control of an organization called the Board for International Broadcasting (BIB). The BIB was designed to receive appropriations from Congress, give them to radio managements, and oversee the appropriation of funds. In 1976, the two radio stations merged to form Radio Free Europe/Radio Liberty (RFE/RL) and added the three Baltic language services to their repertoire.

1980s: Glasnost and the Iron Curtain's fall
Funding for RFE/RL increased during the Reagan administration. President Ronald Reagan, a fervent opponent of Communism, urged the stations to be more critical of the communist regimes. This presented a challenge to RFE/RL's broadcast strategy, which had been very cautious since the controversy over its alleged role in the Hungarian Revolution.

During the Mikhail Gorbachev era in the Soviet Union under Glasnost, RFE/RL benefited significantly from the Soviet Union's new openness. Gorbachev stopped the practice of jamming the broadcasts. In addition, dissident politicians and officials could be freely interviewed by RFE/RL for the first time without fearing persecution or imprisonment. By 1990, Radio Liberty had become the most listened-to Western radio station broadcasting to the Soviet Union.

Its coverage of the 1991 August coup enriched sparse domestic coverage of the event and drew in a wide audience. The broadcasts allowed Gorbachev and Boris Yeltsin to stay in touch with the Russian people during this turbulent period. Boris Yeltsin later expressed his gratitude through a presidential decree allowing Radio Liberty to open a permanent bureau in Moscow.

Czechoslovakia's Velvet Revolution 
Following the November 17 demonstrations and brutal crackdown by Czechoslovak riot police, a porter at a dormitory in Prague, reported that a student, Martin Šmíd, had been killed during the clashes. The Charter 77 activist Petr Uhl believed this account and passed it along to major news organizations, who broadcast it. After Reuters and the Voice of America (VOA) reported the story, RFE/RL decided to run it too. However, the report later turned out to be false. The story is credited by many sources with inspiring Czechoslovak citizens to join the subsequent (larger) demonstrations which eventually brought down the communist government.

After 1991
In 1995, RFE/RL moved its headquarters from Munich to Prague, to the building of the Czechoslovak Federal Assembly. It had been vacant since the 1992 dissolution of Czechoslovakia. The Clinton Administration reduced funding significantly and placed the service under the United States Information Agency's oversight.

RFE/RL ended broadcasts to Hungary in 1993 and stopped broadcasts to Poland in 1997. On January 31, 1994, RFE/RL launched broadcasts to the former Yugoslavia in Bosnian, Croatian, and Serbian languages. In the late 1990s RFE/RL launched broadcast to Kosovo in Albanian and to North Macedonia in Macedonian. Broadcast to the Czech Republic proceeded for three more years under the agreement with Czech Radio. In 2004 RFE/RL stopped broadcasting to Estonia, Latvia, Lithuania, Slovakia, Croatia, Montenegro, Bulgaria, and Romania.

RFE/RL Chief Jeffrey Gedmin said in 2008 that the agency's mission is to serve as a surrogate free press in countries where such press is banned by the government or not fully established. It maintains 20 local bureaus. Governments which are subjected to critical reporting often attempt to obstruct the station's activities through a range of tactics, including extensive jamming, shutting down local re-broadcasting affiliates, or finding legal excuses to close down offices.

RFE/RL says that its journalists and freelancers often risk their lives to broadcast information, and their safety has always been a major issue. Reporters have frequently been threatened and persecuted. RFE/RL also faces a number of central security concerns, including cyberterrorist attacks and general terrorist threats. After the September 11 attacks, American and Czech authorities agreed to move RFE/RL's Prague headquarters away from the city center in order to make it less vulnerable to terrorist attack. On February 19, 2009, RFE/RL began broadcasting from its new headquarters east of the city center.

Beyond Europe 

RFE/RL says that it continues to struggle with authoritarian regimes for permission to broadcast freely within their countries. On January 1, 2009, Azerbaijan imposed a ban on all foreign media in the country, including RFE/RL. Kyrgyzstan suspended broadcasts of Radio Azattyk, RFE/RL's Kyrgyz language service, because it had asked that the government be able to pre-approve its programming. Other states such as Belarus, Iran, Turkmenistan, Tajikistan, and Uzbekistan prohibit re-broadcasting to local stations, making programming difficult for average listeners to access.

In 1998, RFE/RL began broadcasting to Iraq. Iraqi president Saddam Hussein ordered Iraqi Intelligence Service, to "violently disrupt the Iraqi broadcasting of Radio Free Europe". IIS planned to attack the headquarters with an RPG-7 from a window across the street. Czech Security Information Service (BIS) foiled the plot.

In 2008, Afghan president Hamid Karzai urged his government to provide assistance to a rape victim after listening to her story on Radio Azadi, RFE/RL's Afghan service. According to REF/RL in 2009, Radio Azadi was the most popular radio station in Afghanistan, and Afghan listeners mailed hundreds of hand-written letters to the station each month.

In September 2009, RFE/RL announced that it would begin new Pashto-language broadcasting to the Afghanistan–Pakistan border region.

The following month RFE/RL introduced a daily, one-hour Russian-language broadcast, broadcasting to the breakaway regions of South Ossetia and Abkhazia. The program, called Ekho Kavkaza (Echo of the Caucasus), focused on local and international news and current affairs, organized in coordination with RFE/RL's Georgian Service.

On January 15, 2010, RFE/RL began broadcasting to the Pashtun tribal areas of Pakistan in Pashto. The service, known as Radio Mashaal ("Torch"), was created in an attempt to counter the growing number of local Islamic extremist radio stations broadcasting in the border region between Pakistan and Afghanistan. Radio Mashaal says that it broadcasts local and international news with in-depth reports on terrorism, politics, women's issues, and health care (with an emphasis on preventive medicine). The station broadcasts roundtable discussions and interviews with tribal leaders and local policymakers, in addition to regular call-in programs.

2010s 
On October 14, 2014, Radio Free Europe/Radio Liberty (RFE/RL) and the Voice of America (VOA) launched a new Russian-language TV news program, Current Time, "to provide audiences in countries bordering Russia with a balanced alternative to the disinformation produced by Russian media outlets that is driving instability in the region". Over the next two years, Current Time – led by RFE/RL in cooperation with VOA – expanded to become a 24/7 digital and TV stream for Russian-speaking audiences worldwide.

Around 2017, Voice of America and RFE/RL launched Polygraph.info, and the Russian-language factograph.info, as fact-checking sites. On July 19, 2018, RFE/RL announced it will be returning its news services to Bulgaria and Romania by the end of 2018 amid growing concern about a reversal in democratic gains and attacks on the rule of law and the judiciary in the two countries. The Romanian news service re-launched on January 14, 2019, and the Bulgarian service re-launched on January 21, 2019. On 8 September 2020 the Hungarian service was also relaunched.

In a response to the United States Department of Justice requesting RT to register as a foreign agent under the Foreign Agents Registration Act, Russia's Justice Ministry also requested RFE/RL and Voice of America to register as foreign agents under the law ФЗ N 121-ФЗ / 20.07.2012 in December 2017.

2020s 
In the aftermath of Belarusian presidential elections of 2020, Radio Liberty and other independent media resources experienced significant pressure from the government and law enforcement. Journalists’ accreditations were cancelled by the authorities on October 2, 2020. On July 16, 2021, the office in Minsk and homes of the journalists were raided by the police.

In Russia, the government designated radio's website as a "foreign agent" on May 14, 2021. RL's bank accounts were frozen. By that time, Roskomnadzor, the Russian mass media regulator, had initiated 520 cases against the broadcaster, with total fines for the RL's refusal to mark its content with the "foreign agent" label estimated at $2.4m. On May 19, 2021, RL filed a legal case at the European Court of Human Rights, accusing the Russian government of violating freedom of expression and freedom of the media.

Programs

49 Minutes of Jazz
The program was a musical review by Dmitri Savitski from 1989 to 2004. The theme song of the program was "So Tired" by Bobby Timmons. The program was cancelled on April 10, 2004 due to "the change of Liberty's format".

See also
 Alhurra
 Constantine Kromiadi
 Operation Mockingbird and white propaganda
 Radio Free Asia
 Radio y Televisión Martí
 Women, Life, Freedom

References

Bibliography 
 
 Holt, Robert T. Radio Free Europe (U of Minnesota Press, 1958)
 
 Johnson, A. Ross, Radio Free Europe and Radio Liberty: The CIA Years and Beyond. (Woodrow Wilson Center Press, Stanford University Press, 2010)
 Johnson, A. Ross and R. Eugene Parta (eds.), Cold War Broadcasting: Impact on the Soviet Union and Eastern Europe. (Budapest: Central European University Press, 2010)
 Machcewicz, Paweł. Poland's War on Radio Free Europe, 1950–1989 (Trans. by Maya Latynski. Cold War International History Project Series) (Stanford University Press, 2015). 456 pp. online review
 
 
 
 
 Urban, George R. (1997).  Radio Free Europe and the pursuit of democracy: My War Within the Cold War. Yale University Press. Urban was the director of RFE in the 1980s.

In other languages

External links 

 
 
 RFE/RL Broadcast and Corporate Records compiled by the Hoover Institution
 RFE/RL collection of declassified documents compiled by the Woodrow Wilson International Center for Scholars and made publicly available through the Wilson Center Digital Archive
 
 
 
 CIA archives

 
Radio stations established in 1949
1949 establishments in New York City
Cold War organizations
International broadcasters
United States government propaganda organizations
American propaganda during the Cold War
Anti-communist organizations
Central Intelligence Agency front organizations
Russian-language radio stations
Soviet Union–United States relations
Companies based in Munich
Mass media in Prague
Propaganda radio broadcasts
Ukrainian-language radio stations
CIA-funded propaganda
Democracy promotion
Kazakh-language mass media
Media listed in Russia as foreign agents
Women, Life, Freedom